The Call of the Wilderness is a 1926 American silent Western film directed by Jack Nelson and starring  Edna Marion, Sidney De Gray and Albert J. Smith. Location shooting took place around Newhall in California.

Cast
 Lewis Sargent as Andrew Horton Jr
 Edna Marion as Dorothy Deveau - Land Agent's Daughter
 Sidney De Gray as Andrew Horton Sr. 
 Albert J. Smith as Red Morgan 
 Max Asher as Joe
 Tom Connelly as Tom, the Banker's Son
 George Y. Harvey as Jean Deveau - Land Agent 
 Sandow the Dog as Sandow

References

External links
 

1926 films
1926 adventure films
1926 Western (genre) films
American black-and-white films
American adventure films
Films directed by Jack Nelson
Associated Exhibitors films
Chesterfield Pictures films
Films shot in California
Silent American Western (genre) films
1920s English-language films
1920s American films
Silent adventure films